The Blackwater coal mine is a coal mine located in the Bowen Basin in Central Queensland, south of the town of Blackwater. The mine has coal reserves amounting to 877 million tonnes of coking coal, one of the largest coal reserves in Australia and the world, and has a strike length of 80 kilometres, the open pit being 35 kilometres long. It is owned by BHP Mitsubishi Alliance and has an annual production capacity of 13 million tonnes of coal.

The mine won the 2006 Mine of the Year award at the Australian Mining Prospect Awards.

History
The mine was established by the Utah Development Company in 1967. Mining operations at South Blackwater mine were incorporated into Blackwater coal mine in late 2000.  In 2007, a new coal handling preparation allowed for a significant increase in production.

In August 2022, BHP sought federal approval for a new mine, an extension of the Blackwater mine, but named Blackwater South, to run until 2112, 90 years hence.

See also

Blackwater railway system
Coal in Australia

References 

Coal mines in Queensland
Surface mines in Australia
Mines in Central Queensland
1967 establishments in Australia